The Show is a 1922 American silent short comedy film directed by Larry Semon and Norman Taurog and featuring Oliver Hardy.

Plot
As described in a film magazine, Larry Semon is a stage hand and is also part of the audience, which keeps one guessing regarding the dual capacity. He steals a bouquet of flowers meant for the star and gives them to a member of the chorus, not knowing that a cat has knocked over a bottle of ink on them. He then turns on the wind machine at the wrong time, filling the stage and playhouse with black powder. He attempts to save the star's jewels but is knocked senseless, and dreams of a wild ride to recover them. Then he wakes up.

Cast
 Larry Semon as The Prop Man / Gentle Onlooker
 Oliver Hardy as Stage manager / Audience Member (credited as Babe Hardy)
 Frank Alexander as Ballet dancer / Wife of Man with Family
 Lucille Carlisle as Leading lady
 Betty Young as Dancer
 Alice Davenport as Audience member
 Al Thompson as Man who Smuggles Family In
 Pete Gordon as His son
 Frank J. Coleman as Audience member / Woman with Hat / Cop
 Jack Miller Jr. as Villain
 Grover Ligon as Bald Policeman
 William Hauber as Audience member (credited as Bill Hauber)
 Coy Watson, Jr.
 Ernie Adams as Magician / Audience Member (uncredited)
 Madame Sul-Te-Wan as Maid (uncredited)

See also
 Oliver Hardy filmography

References

External links

1922 films
1922 comedy films
1922 short films
American silent short films
Silent American comedy films
American black-and-white films
Films directed by Larry Semon
Films directed by Norman Taurog
American comedy short films
1920s American films